Jenna Russell (born 5 October 1967) is an English actress and singer. She has appeared on the stage in London in both musicals and dramas, as well as appearing with the Royal Shakespeare Company. She performed the role of Dot in Sunday in the Park with George in the West End and on Broadway, receiving the Tony Award nomination and the 2006 Olivier Award for Best Actress in a Musical for her role. She has also appeared in several television series, including Born and Bred and EastEnders.

Life and career
Russell was born in London, grew up in Dundee, and attended the Sylvia Young Theatre School. She has said she had a "tricky childhood".

In 1985, Russell appeared as Matthew's girlfriend Christine in the ITV comedy Home to Roost.

Russell also sang the theme tune to the BBC sitcom, Red Dwarf, with her version of the song being used in all series of the show. Russell began her career as an understudy for Eponine and Fantine and later took over Fantine in Les Misérables and performed with the Royal Shakespeare Company (RSC) for the first portion of her career. Plays there included The Beggar's Opera as Lucy Lockit in April 1992 and again in April 1993 at the Barbican Centre. She also appeared in the RSC production of Alan Ayckbourn's Wildest Dreams at the Barbican in December 1993.

From 1990 to 1992 she played one of the lead characters, Maggie Lomax, in primetime BBC TV comedy On the Up. 

She performed in three shows at The Bridewell Theatre: On a Clear Day You Can See Forever as Daisy (January 2000), Hello Again (March 2001) and a concert, The Cutting Edge in June 2000. Other stage work includes Samantha Lord in High Society at Sheffield Crucible, Young Sally in Follies at the Shaftesbury Theatre in 1987, Bertrande in Martin Guerre at the West End's Prince Edward theatre (1998), Felicity in Landslide at the West Yorkshire Playhouse in Leeds, and Three Sisters at the Royal Court.

She left the cast of Songs for a New World during rehearsal to play Deborah Gilder in the television series Born and Bred in 2002 through 2005.

In 2005 she appeared as the Floor Manager in the Doctor Who episodes "Bad Wolf" and "The Parting of the Ways". Also in 2005, she played the lead role of Sarah Brown in the West End production of Guys and Dolls opposite (at various times) Ewan McGregor, Nigel Harman, Sarah Lancashire, Jane Krakowski and Nigel Lindsay. She received a nomination for the 2006 Laurence Olivier Award for Best Actress in a Musical for this role. In 2006, she took over from Anna-Jane Casey as Dot/Marie in the London revival of Sunday in the Park with George, by Stephen Sondheim for which she won the 2007 Olivier Award for Best Actress in a Musical.

She subsequently played Amy alongside Felicity Kendal in the West End revival of the play Amy's View in 2006. In 2008, Russell reprised her role as Dot in the Broadway transfer of Sunday in the Park with George. The production opened on 21 February 2008 and ran until 29 June 2008 at Studio 54. Russell won the Theatre World Award and received Drama Desk Award and Tony Award nominations for Best Actress in a Musical, losing to Patti LuPone.

In 2009 she appeared in the inaugural episode of the resurrected TV series Minder as Petra.

Russell has appeared in Into the Woods twice. For the Donmar Warehouse production in 1998, she played Cinderella. For the Regent's Park Open Air Theatre in 2010, she played the role of the Baker's Wife.

In August 2012, Russell took to the London stage again at the Soho Theatre in Soho Cinders. She then played the role of Mary in Stephen Sondheim's Merrily We Roll Along at the Harold Pinter Theatre in London's West End, following a run at the Menier Chocolate Factory.

From February 2014 she appeared as Penelope Pennywise in the London production of Urinetown: The Musical at the St. James Theatre. She reprises the role for the West End production at the Apollo Theatre from September 2014.

In January 2016 she starred with Sheila Hancock in the first UK production of Grey Gardens at The Southwark Playhouse  to sell-out audiences.

In December 2016 she took over from previous actress Susan Tully in the role of Michelle Fowler in BBC One soap-opera EastEnders. In 2018 Russell decided to leave EastEnders to pursue other work. Her last appearance aired on Tuesday 17 April 2018.

In September 2022, Russell led the cast in Alan Ayckbourn's Woman in Mind (December Bee?) at Chichester Festival Theatre.

Awards and nominations

Personal life
Russell is the partner of actor Raymond Coulthard, and they are the parents of a girl. Russell revealed that she was in the early stages of her pregnancy when she appeared in Sunday in the Park with George on Broadway.

References

Bibliography
Broadway.com interview, 21 February 2008 
Official London Theatre interview, 21 February 2006

External links 
 

Interview with Jenna Russell on Theatre.com

1967 births
English television actresses
English stage actresses
English musical theatre actresses
Royal Shakespeare Company members
English Shakespearean actresses
Laurence Olivier Award winners
Living people
English soap opera actresses
Theatre World Award winners